Antonin Claude Dominique Just de Noailles (22 August 1777 in Paris1 August 1846 in Paris), 7th Prince of Poix then (from 1834) 4th Spanish Duke of Mouchy, 3rd French Duke of Mouchy and Duke of Poix, was a French politician.

Biography
Son of Philippe-Louis-Marc-Antoine de Noailles (1752–1819) and of Anne Louise Marie de Beauvau (1750–1834), he was a student at the College des Grassins. Anne Louise Marie was a daughter of Charles Just de Beauvau and grand daughter of Emmanuel Théodose de La Tour d'Auvergne.

During the French revolution, which tested his family so cruelly, he lived in Paris with his mother in the greatest darkness.  He did not reappear until the Consulate, when in 1803, he married a niece of the Prince de Talleyrand and was introduced in 1806 to Napoleon, who named him chamberlain. Created Count of Worsen on 27 September 1810, he commanded, in 1814, a company of the national guard of Paris.

He welcomed the return of the Bourbons with the Treaty of Fontainebleau (1814). Louis XVIII treated him extremely well with Compiègne, created him Knight of the Order of Saint-Louis and commander of the Légion d'honneur on 13 August 1814 and named him ambassador to Saint Petersburg, where he remained until 1819; persona grata with the czar, he was  the only foreign minister allowed at the imperial table on the dinner of 24 December 1814.  With the death of his father, he inherited the title count of Noailles, after the renunciation of his older brother, Charles-Arthur-Tristan-Languedoc de Noailles, 2nd duc de Mouchy.  Returning to France, he was presented to the delegation, and lost 1 October 1821, in the 2nd Arrondissement of Meurthe (Lunéville), with 51 votes against 107 with the elected official, Mr. Laruelle.  Nominated president of the large college of Meurthe in 1824, he was elected, on March 6 of this same year, by this same college, with 185 votes (194 voters, 224 registered voters).  He expressed his moderate opinions in the Chamber of Deputies, and joined the liberal party.

Charles X named him knight of the Order of the Holy Spirit on 30 May 1825.

Returning to private life in 1827, Mr. de Noailles occupied himself in charitable works, was one of the founders of the  Company for the improvement of the prisons and chaired administration of the  Company of prévoyance.

Family life 
He is the younger son of Philippe-Louis-Marc-Antoine de Noailles (1752–1819), and of the duchess Anne Louise Marie of Beauvau-Craon (1750–1834).

He married on May 11, 1803  Françoise Xavière Melanie Honorine of Talleyrand-Périgord  (September 18, 1785, ParisFebruary 19, 1863, Versailles), lady of Madame la duchesse de Berry, niece of Prince de Talleyrand, and daughter of Archambaud-Louis-Joseph (September 1, 1762, ParisMay 3, 1838, Saint-Germain-en-Laye), duke of Talleyrand-Périgord, general lieutenant of the armies of the king, and Madelaine-Henriette-Sabine Olivier de Senozan-Viriville (1764July 26, 1794), victim of revolutionary Tribunal.

They had four children: 
 Charles-Philippe-Henri de Noailles (1808–1854), 5th duc de Mouchy, Princes de Poix;
  Charles Antonin (March 13, 1810August 24, 1852, Chateau du Val (Seine-et-Marne)), styled comte de Noailles, commander of the Légion d'honneur, married in Paris April 25, 1849, Anne Marie Elena Cosvelt;
  Amédée Adelaide Louis (October 9, 1811February 27, 1860, Valves), Secretary of embassy;
  Angelica Léontine Sabine Alexandrine (May 13, 1819, Paris – March 20, 1870, Paris) who married (September 5, 1846) Charles Henry Lionel Widdrington Standish (1823–1883).

Offices 
Old chamberlain of Napoleon, Just de Noailles became ambassador of France in Russia (1814–1819) then appointed of Meurthe (Lunéville), (1824–1827).

1777 births
1846 deaths
104
French nobility
Knights of the Golden Fleece of Spain
Knights of the Order of Saint Louis
Just
19th-century French diplomats
Ambassadors of France to the Russian Empire